The Manchester Road Race is a 4.748 mile (7.641 km) footrace held annually on Thanksgiving Day in Manchester, Connecticut. Race proceeds are donated each year to Muscular Dystrophy research and about 18 other local charities. Beginning promptly at 10:00am every Thanksgiving Morning, the race attracts athletes of all ages and abilities. First run in 1927, the race regularly attracts accomplished runners from across the United States as well as internationally recognized competitors.

History
The race was first held in 1927 with only twelve runners participating in the race. The race was conceived and promoted by the captain of the Manchester High School cross country team Frank "Duke" Haraburda, who competed and placed second in the inaugural race. The race continued annually until 1934, when the economic crisis during the Great Depression resulted in the race's cancellation. Consequently, the race was not held for 10 years (from 1935 to 1944), but began running again from 1945 to 2019, and will resume in 2021. In 1967 the race was recognized as the second largest race in the country, with more than 200 participants. Due to growing interest and participation in this event, the race surpassed 1,000 runners in 1976 and just ten years later attracted more than 6,000 runners. In 1994 the number of runners had reached 10,000 and in 2009 over 12,000 people officially ran the race. "The Manchester Road Race has grown to be the largest race in Connecticut, the third largest in New England and in the top 25 largest distance races in the country." (Manchester Road Race Committee)

In 1960, Julia Chase-Brand entered Manchester in hopes of participating in the road race, but she was turned down due to her gender. Race officials told her that if she ran she would be banned from racing for life. She lobbied to be allowed to race for a year, but without success. In 1961 she did run the race, without permission, but then racing's governing body vowed to ban her from all competition unless she agreed to stay out of "men's" road races. She agreed to stay out. Two other women, Chris McKenzie and Dianne Lechausse, also ran the race, although McKenzie veered off onto the sidewalk before the finish line so as not to get in trouble with racing officials. Julia finished in 33 minutes 40 seconds, which would have given her 128th place, ahead of 10 men, if her time was officially counted. Lechausse finished with a time of 41:12.

In 1977, the race committee created male and female divisions, rather than a single open registration. 

Irish immigrant Ray Treacy finished second in the 1979 and 1981 races. He coached four Providence College runners who also won the MRR: Mark Caroll (1998 and 2000), Amy Rudolph (1995-97, 2000 and 2002), Kim Smith (2004 and 2005), and Emily Sisson (2017).

Haron Lagat of Kenya won the 2009 Race with a time of 21:40, beating Chicago's Patrick Smyth by one second—Smyth was also the runner up in 2008.  Alemtsehay Misganaw, an Ethiopian who lives in New York City, won the 2009 women's race, beating five-time champion Amy Rudolph by a second.

Due to the COVID-19 pandemic, the 2020 edition of the race was held virtually.

Overview
The official registration has been over 9,000 every year since 1991, with the highest registration of 15,000 in 2010. In addition to registered runners, many registered walkers and unregistered runners participate. The race committee estimates that approximately 1,000 unregistered runners participated in the 2005 race.  In addition to the competitive spirit of the road race, Manchester Road Race enthusiasts are attracted every year to further enhance the good spirit of the event. Also giving this race a unique and high-spirited atmosphere, runners and fans wear costumes and may enter a competition to see who has the best costume each year. Famous among these costumed runners are the "Blues Brothers" and "Safety Man."  Of note, "Safety Man" also reminds runners and the crowd lining the streets that a safe morning means an enjoyable Thanksgiving afternoon. In a historic Manchester Road Race tradition preceding the race, "Safety Man" will lead the cavalcade of elite runners and alert spectators along the course that the race has begun and runners are approaching.

Notable runners

Joe McCluskey
Years won: 1930, 1931, 1932, 1947

Joe McCluskey was an American Olympic bronze medalist in the 1932 steeplechase who is recognized for winning the race four times. His brother John was the winner of the first race held in 1927. Joe's final Manchester Road Race victory came in 1947, 17 years after his first.

Amby Burfoot
Years won: 1968, 1969, 1971, 1972, 1973, 1974, 1975, 1976, 1977

Amby Burfoot is an American runner from New London, Connecticut who is known for winning the 1968 Boston Marathon. As of 2015, he had competed in the Manchester Road Race 53 times in a row, winning 9 times (7 consecutively). His 53 consecutive races is the record for the Manchester Road Race, breaking the record of barefoot runner, Charlie "Doc" Robbins, who ran 51, though missing two while serving in WWII. Burfoot later became a journalist, eventually becoming the Executive Editor of Runner's World magazine.

Results

See also
Turkey Trot
Road running

References

External links
Official Manchester Road Race website

Long-distance running competitions
Sports in Manchester, Connecticut
Tourist attractions in Hartford County, Connecticut
Road running competitions in the United States